William Ivor Passmore (22 June 1915 – 13 October 1986) was a South African boxer who competed in the 1936 Summer Olympics.

In 1936 he was eliminated in the quarter-finals of the flyweight class after losing his fight to Alfredo Carlomagno of Argentina.

1936 Olympic results
Below is the record of William Passmore, a South African flyweight boxer who competed at the 1936 Berlin Olympics:

 Round of 32: bye
 Round of 16: defeated Mahmoud Ezzat (Egypt) on points
 Quarterfinal: lost to Alfredo Carlomagno (Argentina) points

External links
William Passmore's profile at Sports Reference.com

1915 births
1986 deaths
Flyweight boxers
Olympic boxers of South Africa
Boxers at the 1936 Summer Olympics
South African male boxers